Greek life at San Diego State University (SDSU) has an extensive history dating back nearly a century and has played an influential role in the university's development over time. Today it encompasses more than 40 active chapters of social and culturally-based fraternities and sororities recognized by the university, each represented through one of four governing councils. Honors, service and professional Greek-letter societies also exist and are recognized student organizations at SDSU, though they operate independently of the Office of Fraternity & Sorority Life.

History 
The first fraternity on campus was the local Epsilon Eta fraternity, which formed on October 25, 1921. The group maintained strict rules for its members and limited the chapter to 20 male students. The first local sorority, known as Shen Yo, was also established in 1921. By the end of the decade there were six other fraternities and eight sororities. The fraternities and sororities were all local and did not attain national affiliations until after World War II with the exception of one (Alpha Sigma Alpha sorority, chartered in 1932). On October 10, 1924, the Inter-Fraternity Council (IFC) was founded. The organization consisted of the nine sororities then on campus plus the two fraternities. The organization's purpose was stated as "boosting a high scholarship standard among the members of the fraternal organizations, and of cooperating with the faculty in all matters which lead to the success of the College." The IFC published the grade point averages of fraternities and sororities at the end of each semester, which stimulated a competition for scholastic standing which continues today. On a 3.0 scale, the average GPA (grade point average) for all students at the time was 1.49. For fraternity members it was 1.35 and for sorority members it was 1.47. After a couple of years of the co-educational governing organization, the sororities split from the IFC to create their own organization, the Inter-Sorority Council (later became the College Panhellenic Association [CPA]). By the mid-1930s there were eight fraternities and eleven sororities on campus, and later the Greek community expanded to fifteen fraternities and twelve sororities in the 1940s.

The post World War II period saw a frenzy to "go national" among the fraternities and sororities. Between 1947 and 1951, five national fraternities colonized new chapters at SDSU and an additional nine formed chapters through absorbing existing local fraternities on campus. Theta Chi became the first fraternity on campus affiliated with a national organization in 1947. Alpha Xi Delta kickstarted a similar trend for sororities upon chartering in 1949, with nine other national sororities following suit in quickly absorbing the remaining nine local sororities. In 1951, Kappa Alpha Psi fraternity chartered on campus, becoming San Diego State's first African-American Greek organization.

The arrival of national fraternities also began the trend of Greek organizations starting to acquire property in the College Area for chapter houses. Delta Sigma Phi became the first fraternity to own a chapter house, with Kappa Delta becoming the first sorority to acquire a house shortly thereafter in 1952. The 1950s was a period of steady increase of membership in the Greek community, coinciding with the gradual increase in undergraduate enrollment at the university.

The emergence of the counterculture phenomenon of the late 1960s and early 1970s saw interest in fraternities and sororities decline and the Greek community population dwindled to below 700, with several organizations closing. On April 6, 1978, the Gamma Phi Beta sorority hired a plane to drop marshmallows on fraternity houses during Derby Week, a philanthropy event among the Greek community hosted by the Sigma Chi fraternity. The plane crashed near Peterson Gym on the west side of campus, injuring four students aboard. In 1983, after a USA Today article reported that SDSU Greeks' GPAs were below the campus average, SDSU tightened restrictions and supervision, and by 1989 their grades had increased to slightly above the university average. The Greek system gradually began to grow again in the late seventies following the close of the Vietnam War before spiking in the 1980s, reaching a peak of upwards of 2,900 members in 1988. At this point there were 20 fraternities and 13 sororities officially affiliated with the Interfraternity Council and College Panhellenic Association, respectively, as well as six additional independent fraternities and sororities. This made it one of the largest fraternity and sorority systems in the western U.S.

The 1990s ultimately proved to be a less prosperous time for social fraternities and sororities at the university than the previous decade. A fiscal crisis in California early in the decade severely impacted the California State University system and SDSU was deeply impacted by budget cuts. A significant decline in enrollment at the University resulted and several organizations shut down due to operational and conduct issues. Despite the turmoil, the Greek community still experienced substantial growth during the 1990s, though this time it centered primarily around the establishment of numerous culturally-based fraternities and sororities. This led to the establishment of SDSU's fourth Greek governing council, the United Sorority and Fraternity Council (USFC), on September 24, 1997.

The early 2000s ushered in a new era for the Greek community with the SDSU Foundation's landmark development of Fraternity Row in 2002, where eight fraternities moved into newly-constructed chapter houses in a 1.4 acre complex adjacent to the also newly-constructed Viejas Arena (then Cox Arena). The complex consists of eight free-standing two story chapter houses, each with a private courtyard, and a total of 61 two and three bedroom apartment units (each overlooking one of the courtyards), in a contiguous four story structure. The Foundation had planned to also construct "Sorority Row", a similar project designed with five free-standing chapter houses, following the completion of the Piedra Del Sol apartment complex and Fraternity Row. The project was abandoned in 2006 however, after the Foundation declared the project financially infeasible, citing escalating construction-material costs and a lack of commitment from sororities.

In May 2008, the university community was shaken by the results of an investigation into illegal drug use in the College Area. Dozens of individuals were arrested in a large scale drug bust (known as Operation Sudden Fall), including several students, some of which were members of fraternities. Between the Spring of 2008 and the Spring of 2010, the Interfraternity Council saw its membership drop from sixteen chapters down to just nine, with seven chapters closing during this period all over a variety of misconduct issues. Since this time, the Greek community has experienced steady growth, coinciding with growth of the university, a renewed interest in Greek life, and increased investment and involvement by alumni and administrators in educational programs for Greek members and organizations.

Today there are a total of more than 40 fraternities and sororities, including both general and culturally-based organizations, represented through one of the four governing councils.

Chapters 
Four governing councils represent the social fraternities and sororities of San Diego State University.

College Panhellenic Association (CPA) 
The College Panhellenic Association (CPA) is the governing body of all National Panhellenic Conference (NPC) general social sororities on campus. With its nine active chapters, it currently represents over 1,700 women. According to its website, "the College Panhellenic Association aims to develop and maintain women's fraternity life and interfraternity relations at high levels of accomplishment".

Active chapters 

* indicates original charter date with national organization, does not reflect origin as previously local sorority (see below)

Master list of chapters 

* indicates original charter date with national organization, does not reflect origin as previously local sorority (see below)

Local sorority origins 
Several sororities originated locally before later affiliating with national organizations:

 Alpha Chi Omega originated as Sigma Pi Theta (ΣΠΘ) in 1924
 Alpha Gamma Delta originated as Gamma Phi Zeta (ΓΦΖ) in 1924
 Alpha Phi originated as Phi Kappa Gamma (ΦΚΓ) in 1924
 Alpha Xi Delta originated as Delta Chi Phi (ΔΧΦ) in 1923
 Chi Omega originated as Shen Yo in 1921
 Delta Zeta originated as Alpha Sigma Chi (ΑΣΧ) in 1939 
 Gamma Phi Beta originated as Kappa Theta (ΚΘ) in 1923
 Kappa Alpha Theta originated as Chi Theta (ΧΘ) in 1929
 Kappa Delta originated as Epsilon Pi Theta (ΕΠΘ) in 1931
 Pi Beta Phi originated as Phi Sigma Nu (ΦΣΝ) in 1925
 Sigma Kappa originated as Tau Zeta Rho (TZP) in 1924

CPA activity timeline

Interfraternity Council (IFC) 
The Interfraternity Council is the governing body of general social fraternities on the San Diego State campus. Most of its member organizations belong to the North American Interfraternity Conference. The Interfraternity Council was formed on October 10, 1924, initially encompassing both fraternities and sororities. The purpose of the organization was stated to be "boosting a high scholarship standard among the members of the fraternal organizations, and of cooperating with the faculty in all matters which lead to the success of the College".

Active chapters 

^ indicates historically IFC-affiliated chapter currently active without SDSU & IFC recognition

* indicates original charter date with national organization, does not reflect origin as previously local fraternity (see below)

Master list of chapters 

* indicates original charter date with national organization, does not reflect origin as previously local fraternity (see below)

Local fraternity origins 
Several fraternities originated locally before later affiliating with national organizations:

 Alpha Tau Omega originated as Tau Delta Chi (ΤΔΧ) in 1926
 Kappa Alpha originated as Omega Xi (ΩΞ) in 1926
 Kappa Sigma originated as Eta Omega Delta (ΗΩΔ) in 1922
 Phi Kappa Tau originated as Kappa Phi Sigma (ΚΦΣ) in 1926
 Pi Kappa Alpha originated as Delta Pi Beta (ΔΠΒ) in 1928
 Sigma Alpha Epsilon originated as Epsilon Eta (ΕΗ) in 1921
 Sigma Chi originated as Phi Lambda Xi (ΦΛΞ) in 1925
 Sigma Phi Epsilon originated as Sigma Delta Epsilon (ΣΔΕ) in 1940
 Tau Kappa Epsilon originated as Sigma Lambda (ΣΛ) in 1926

IFC activity timeline

National Pan-Hellenic Council (NPHC) 
The National Pan-Hellenic Council (NPHC) is the collaborative organization of historically African American, international Greek lettered fraternities and sororities at San Diego State. Its member organizations are members of the national council of the same name, the National Pan-Hellenic Council. Its mission statement is "Unanimity within the council for the purpose of maintaining an influential and puissant presence by member organizations through programs, community service, and camaraderie for the betterment of the communities in which we serve".

Fraternities

Sororities

United Sorority and Fraternity Council (USFC) 
The United Sorority and Fraternity Council was founded on the campus of San Diego State University on September 24, 1997. The council is composed of various Asian/Pacific Islander-interest, Latino/Latina-interest, multi-cultural, and pride-based sororities and fraternities. The council's mission is "to provide a governing council for its respective organizations and promote unity and respect amongst themselves, the university, and the community.

Asian/Pacific Islander-Based Chapters 
Fraternities

Sororities

Latino/Latina-Based Chapters 
Fraternities

Sororities

Multicultural-Based Chapters 
Fraternities

Sororities

Pride-Based Chapters 
Fraternity

Sorority

Auxiliary Organizations

FratMANers 
Fraternity Men Against Negative Environments & Rape Situations

Greek Life Activities Board (GLAB) 
Coordination board for activities within the Greek community

Order of Omega 
Affiliate of the national Order of Omega, recognizing "fraternity men and women who have attained a high standard of leadership in inter-fraternity activities."

Rho Lambda 
Leadership recognition society for sorority women from all female/co-ed councils

Sisster 
Sororities Invested in Survivor Support, Training, and Ending Rape culture

Notable alumni 
Many notable alumni of San Diego State University were members of fraternities and sororities during their undergraduate years. Some are listed below.

 John Baldessari, conceptual artist - Sigma Chi
 Clair Burgener, former member of the U.S. House of Representatives (1973—1983) - Sigma Chi
 Robert Cardenas, retired brigadier general of the United States Air Force - Sigma Chi
 Will Demps, former NFL safety and defensive back (2002—2008) - Sigma Pi
 Fred Dryer, former NFL defensive end (1969—1981), actor known best for lead role on Hunter - Tau Kappa Epsilon
 Brett Faryniarz, former NFL linebacker (1988—1995) - Tau Kappa Epsilon
 Kevin Faulconer, 36th Mayor of San Diego (2014—2020) - Kappa Sigma
 Joe Gibbs, 3-time Super Bowl champion head coach, 4-time NASCAR Cup Series champion (as owner of Joe Gibbs Racing) - Sigma Chi
 Bob Goen, television personality and gameshow host, best known for role on Entertainment Tonight - Sigma Alpha Epsilon
 Robert B. Johnston, retired United States Marine Corps lieutenant general - Pi Kappa Alpha
 Robert E. Kennedy, seventh president of California Polytechnic State University, San Luis Obispo (Cal Poly), namesake of Cal Poly campus library - Alpha Tau Omega (as Tau Delta Chi)
 Andrew Lauer, documentary filmmaker and actor, known for role as “Charlie” on Caroline in the City, ultimately completed his degree at the University of New Hampshire - Tau Kappa Epsilon
 Jason Lewis, actor, best known for roles on Sex and the City and Midnight, Texas - Delta Upsilon
 Art Linkletter, radio and television personality - Alpha Tau Omega
 Doug Manchester, real estate developer, businessman, philanthropist - Sigma Chi
 David McKenna, screenwriter and film producer, known for the screenplays for American History X (1998), Blow (2001) and S.W.A.T. (2003) - Sigma Alpha Epsilon
 Merrill McPeak, retired 4-star general in the United States Air Force, former acting United States Secretary of the Air Force (1993) - Sigma Chi
 Al Michaels, television sportscaster, known for his many years calling NFL games, spending nearly two decades with ABC's Monday Night Football and over a decade with NBC Sunday Night Football, ultimately completed his undergraduate degree at Arizona State University - Sigma Nu
 Sophia A. Nelson, author, political strategist, opinion writer, and attorney - Alpha Kappa Alpha
 Graig Nettles, former MLB third baseman (1967—1988), 6-time all-star and 2-time World Series champion - Sigma Alpha Epsilon
 Leon W. Parma, businessman, banker, former co-owner of the San Diego Padres - Sigma Chi
 Gregory Peck, actor, five-time Academy Award for Best Actor recipient, ultimately completed undergrad at University of California, Berkeley - Sigma Alpha Epsilon (as Epsilon Eta)
 Ralph Pesqueira, entrepreneur, credited with the invention of the Taquito, founder of El Indio Mexican Restaurant, former member of the California State University Board of Trustees - Sigma Chi
 Fred Pierce, real estate developer and philanthropist - Beta Theta Pi
 Jerry Sanders, 34th Mayor of San Diego (2005—2012), San Diego Police Department Chief of police (1993—1999) - Sigma Alpha Epsilon
 Brian Sipe, former NFL quarterback (1974—1983), 1980 NFL MVP - Kappa Sigma
 Suzy Spafford, cartoonist, best known for “Suzy's Zoo" line of cards, stickers, stationery, calendars, and similar products sold all over the world - Kappa Delta
 Jimmy Steinfeldt, widely published live-action photographer - Sigma Pi
 George Sunga, television producer known for work on shows including The Smothers Brothers Comedy Hour, Three's Company, Good Times, The Jeffersons, and All in the Family - Tau Kappa Epsilon
 John Clifford Wallace, judge, currently a Senior United States Circuit Judge of the United States Court of Appeals for the Ninth Circuit. Initially appointed as a judge of the United States District Court for the Southern District of California in 1970 by President Richard Nixon - Sigma Chi
 Russell Weiner, billionaire businessman and former politician, creator of Rockstar energy drink - Lambda Chi Alpha

References

Bibliography 

 
 

San Diego State University
San Diego State
Fraternities and sororities in the United States
San Diego State University